George Gregory Sebastian Lewis (May 9, 1917 – February 17, 2011) was an athlete from Trinidad and Tobago who competed in the sprint events. He was born in Arima.

He was a member of the first Trinidad and Tobago Olympic team at the 1948 Summer Olympics in London, United Kingdom.  He competed in both the men's 100 metres and 200 metres. He went out in the first round of the 200 metres, but did qualify for the second round of the 100 metres (by winning his heat), but that was as far as he got.

Competition record

References

Article on George Lewis from 2008
George Lewis' obituary

1917 births
2011 deaths
Trinidad and Tobago male sprinters
Olympic athletes of Trinidad and Tobago
Athletes (track and field) at the 1948 Summer Olympics
People from Arima
Central American and Caribbean Games medalists in athletics